Café Caprice is a well known beach bar and restaurant located on Camps Bay Beach in Camps Bay, Cape Town, South Africa overlooking the Atlantic Ocean. The café is noted for its cocktails and for the celebrities that frequent it.  Notable South African rugby player and restaurateur, James Small, was an owner of the club.

On 17 April 2017 the café was the scene of a shooting that injured two people.   The shooting was related to an organised crime turf war between competing bouncer companies in Cape Town.  Two men were arrested for the shooting.

References 

Buildings and structures in Cape Town
Food and drink companies based in Cape Town
Restaurants in South Africa
Restaurants established in 2001
2001 establishments in South Africa
Tourist attractions in Cape Town